Peter Fox may refer to:

 Peter Fox (artist) (born 1962), American painter
 Peter Fox (bishop) (born 1952), British Anglican vicar and former bishop
 Peter Fox (character), a fictional character in the comic strip FoxTrot by Bill Amend
 Peter Fox (footballer) (born 1957), English former footballer 
 Peter Fox (journalist) (1830–1869), radical journalist active in England
 Peter Fox (librarian) (born 1949), British academic librarian
 Peter Fox (musician) (born 1971), stage name of singer Pierre Baigorry of the German band Seeed
 Peter Fox (Canadian politician) (1921–1989), Canadian politician
 Peter Fox (Welsh politician) (born 1961), Welsh politician
 Peter Fox (professor) (1959–2021), Australian-born data scientist who worked at Rensselaer Polytechnic Institute
 Peter Fox (rugby league, born 1933) (1933–2019), English rugby league footballer and coach
 Peter Fox (rugby league, born 1984), English rugby league footballer
 Peter Fox (sailor) (born 1967), New Zealand sailor
 Peter T. Fox, neuroimaging researcher and neurologist

See also
 Pete Fox (1909–1966), American Major League Baseball player